Alexander and Mischa Zverev were the defending champions, but lost to Adrian Mannarino and Fabrice Martin in the quarterfinals.

Łukasz Kubot and Marcelo Melo won the title, defeating Juan Sebastián Cabal and Robert Farah in the final, 7–6(8–6), 6–7(4–7), [11–9].

Seeds

Draw

Draw

Qualifying

Seeds

Qualifiers
  Nicholas Monroe /  Jackson Withrow

Lucky losers
  Luis David Martínez /  Miguel Ángel Reyes-Varela

Qualifying draw

References

External Links
 Main draw
 Qualifying draw

Abierto Mexicano Telcel - Doubles
Men's Doubles